A number of units of measurement were used in Guinea to measure length, mass, etc.  Since 1910, the metric system has been compulsory in Guinea.

Units used before the metric system

These units were mainly Portugal, England and local.

Length

Several units were used to measure length.  Some of units are provided below:

1 pik = 0.578 m

1 jacktan = 3.658 m.

Mass

A number of units were used to measure mass.  One benda was equal to 0.0642 kg.  One kantar was equal to 0.977 kg.  One gammell was 1/5 kantar. Some other units are given below:

1 akey =  benda

1 mediatabla =  benda

1 aguirage =  benda

1 quinto =  benda

1 piso = 1 uzan =  benda

1 seron =  benda

1 eggaba =  benda

1 benda (offa) =  benda p

One rotl was equal to 0.9538 lb avoirdupois.

References

Guinean culture
Guinea